The Nikon D610 is a full-frame DSLR camera announced by Nikon on October 8, 2013. It improves on its predecessor, the Nikon D600, with a new shutter unit that supports a quiet mode at 3 frames per second and a normal continuous mode at a slightly improved 6 frames per second, as well as improved white balance. The previous model had problems that were traced to its shutter unit.

References

External links

 Nikon D610, Nikon USA
 Nikon D610, Nikon Global
 Nikon D610 specs, dpreview
 Nikon D610 Features

D610
D610
Live-preview digital cameras	 
Cameras introduced in 2013